is a railway station in Midori-ku, Nagoya,  Aichi Prefecture, Japan, operated by Meitetsu.

Lines
Arimatsu Station is served by the Meitetsu Nagoya Main Line and is 52.7 kilometers from the terminus of the line at Toyohashi Station.

Station layout
The station has two elevated side platforms with the station building underneath. The station has automated ticket machines, Manaca automated turnstiles and is staffed.

Platforms

Adjacent stations

Station history
On 1 April 1935, the Aichi Electric Railway merged with the Nagoya Railroad (the forerunner of present-day Meitetsu). The station was renamed to its present name on 1 November 1943. The station building was rebuilt from 2000 to 2001.

Passenger statistics
In fiscal 2017, the station was used by an average of 7243 passengers daily. .

Surrounding area
 site of the Battle of Okehazama
former Arimatsu Town Hall

See also
 List of Railway Stations in Japan

References

External links

 Official web page 

Railway stations in Japan opened in 1917
Railway stations in Aichi Prefecture
Stations of Nagoya Railroad
Railway stations in Nagoya